Marcelencio Esajas (born 10 June 2002) is a Dutch professional footballer who plays as a midfielder for Eerste Divisie club Almere City.

Career
Esajas started playing football for Amsterdam-based club Vlug en Vaardig before he was admitted to the Almere City youth academy in 2014. After impressing with the under-21 team coached by Hedwiges Maduro, he signed his first professional contract in September 2021; a three-year deal.

He made his professional debut on 27 August 2021 in an Eerste Divisie match against Roda JC Kerkrade. He started the away game on the bench, but head coach Gertjan Verbeek gave him his debut in the 69th minute when he came on for Ryan Koolwijk in a 4–3 win. He made 18 appearances for the first team in the 2021–22 season, as Almere finished in a disappointing 14th place.

Personal life
Esajas was born in the Netherlands and is of Surinamese descent.

Career statistics

References

2002 births
Living people
Footballers from Amsterdam
Association football midfielders
Dutch footballers
Dutch sportspeople of Surinamese descent
Almere City FC players
Eerste Divisie players